The provincial forum of Tarraco is a Roman archaeological site in Tarragona, Catalonia, Spain, encompassing an area of 18 ha. Together with other Roman remains in the city it makes the Archaeological Ensemble of Tarraco, which was listed in the UNESCO World Heritage Sites in 2000.

It was built starting from 73 AD, by order of Emperor Vespasian, and remained in use until the 5th century. The worship area is now occupied by the Cathedral and other edifices.

Buildings
Provincial Council
Circus
Tabularium (state archive)
State treasure
Curia
Audience Hall
Temple of the Imperial Worship

Roman Forum
Ancient Roman buildings and structures in Catalonia
Ancient Roman forums